Philotheca nutans is a species of flowering plant in the family Rutaceae and is endemic to the south-west of Western Australia. It is a small, densely-branched shrub with club-shaped to cylindrical, glandular-warty leaves and pendent, pale yellow to pale red flowers arranged singly in leaf axils.

Description
The ten stamens are densely woolly-hairy. Flowering occurs from July to September.

Taxonomy and naming
This philotheca was first formally described in 1970 by Paul Wilson who gave it the name Eriostemon nutans and published the description in the journal Nuytsia from specimens collected by Charles Gardner in 1953. In 1998, Wilson changed the name to Philotheca nutans in the same journal.

Distribution and habitat
Philotheca nutans grows in woodland near the Wubin-Paynes Find road in the south-west of Western Australia.

Conservation status
Philotheca nutans is classified as "Priority One" by the Government of Western Australia Department of Parks and Wildlife, meaning that it is known from only one or a few locations which are potentially at risk.

References

nutans
Flora of Western Australia
Sapindales of Australia
Plants described in 1970
Taxa named by Paul G. Wilson